Orifice of the uterus may refer to:

 External orifice of the uterus
 Internal orifice of the uterus